The  was a 1,668-capacity multi-purpose event hall located in Naha, Japan. It was completed in 1970 and demolished in 2019. The hall hosted notable bands such as Kansas.

References

Former music venues
Buildings and structures in Okinawa Prefecture
Naha
Music venues in Japan
1970 establishments in Japan
2019 disestablishments in Japan
Demolished buildings and structures in Japan
Buildings and structures demolished in 2019

ja:那覇市民会館